The Suffren class were two anti-air frigates of the French Navy, designed to protect a fleet against air threats, surface ships, and submarines. They were the first French ships to be built specifically as guided missile frigates. Ordered in 1960, the class was intended to be more numerous, but budget pressure from the French nuclear weapons program limited their number. The lead ship, entered service in 1967 and the second ship, in 1970.

Background and description
The two ships were designed as anti-air and anti-submarine escorts for the s and were similar in concept to the British Type 82 destroyer. They were ordered in 1960 as part of France's new naval policy of deterrence/intervention/defence following the election of Charles de Gaulle as president of France. The French designation for the class was frégates lance-engins (FLE 60). They were designated as frigates by the French Navy but were considered destroyers by publications. They were later re-designated frégates lance-missiles (FLM 60). 

They created a total of 3,440 kW of electrical power through two 1,000 kW turbochargers and three 480 kW diesel alternators. The frigates had a complement of 355 sailors including 23 officers. For increased stabilisation as a weapons platform, the frigates were outfitted with three pairs of non-retractable fin stabilisers. They were considered extremely seaworthy vessels.

The Suffren class were armed with a twin launcher situated on the quarterdeck for the Masurca surface-to-air missile. 48 missiles were carried. The frigates were also equipped with two single-mounted  Modèle 1953 naval guns in positions 'A' and 'B' along the centreline. These were later upgraded to the Modèle 1964. The guns could fire 80 rounds per minute. The frigates also mounted a Malafon anti-submarine missile system. Each ship carried 13 missiles and the magazine was situated in the aft deckhouse. Furthermore, the Suffren class had four launchers for L5 torpedoes, two to each side of the ship, housed in the deckhouse between the mast and the bridge. Each ship carried ten torpedoes. They were the first French warships to deploy torpedoes using fixed catapults.

Fire control was via the DRBI 23 3D radar for air search/tracking housed in a massive radome that dominated the ship's silhouette. The Suffren class also mounted DRBN 32, DRBV 50, two DRBR 51 and DRBC 32A radars. For anti-submarine warfare, they were equipped with DUBV 23 hull-mounted sonar and DUBV 43 towed variable depth sonar. For electronic defence, the vessels initially mounted the Syllex chaff system. The SENIT I tactical data system coordinated sensor data.

Modifications
In 1977 to 1979, the MM38 Exocet anti-ship missile system was fitted to the ships. Each ship carried four missiles. The Masuraca system was upgraded between 1982–1985. In 1985, Duquesne had its DRBV 50 radar replaced with the advanced DRBV 15 system. Suffren underwent the same radar swap-out in 1989–1990 while also having its DRBC 32A gunfire control radar replaced with the newer DRBC 33A system. Furthermore during that refit, the Syllex outfit was replaced with the Dagaie and Sagaie electronic countermeasures systems. Additionally four single-mounted  cannon were fitted two to each side of the ship abaft the DRBC 33A radar. Duquesne was similarly modernised beginning in 1990.

Ships

Construction and career
The two ships of the class were both named after French admirals. Three ships were initially planned with more in a follow-on group, but budgetary constraints caused by building the nuclear deterrent submarines caused the programme to be terminated at two ships. They accompanied the Clemenceau-class aircraft carriers on deployments and as a result were based with them as part of the French Atlantic Fleet upon entering service. In 1975, when the Clemenceaus were transferred to the Mediterranean Fleet, the Suffrens went with them and were based at Toulon.

Suffrens service-life extension refit was delayed due to the ship's deployments to the Persian Gulf during the Iran–Iraq War. Suffrens refit took place from 1989 to 1990. Duquesne underwent its service-life extension refit from 1990 to 1991. Duquesne underwent a further refit in September 1998 to July 1999. Suffren was retired on 2 April 2001. The Suffren class was replaced by the s.

Notes

Citations

References

 
 
 

 
Suffren class
Suffren class
Ship classes of the French Navy